Alex Eala and Priska Madelyn Nugroho won the girls' doubles tennis title at the 2020 Australian Open, defeating Živa Falkner and Matilda Mutavdzic in the final, 6–1, 6–2.

Natsumi Kawaguchi and Adrienn Nagy were the defending champions, but Nagy was no longer eligible to compete in junior events, while Kawaguchi chose not to participate.

Seeds

Draw

Finals

Top half

Bottom half

References 

Girls' Doubles
Australian Open (tennis) by year – Girls' doubles